The 1975 Minnesota Twins finished 76–83, fourth in the American League West.

Offseason
 October 23, 1974: Pat Bourque was traded by the Twins to the Oakland Athletics for Dan Ford and Dennis Myers (minors).
 January 16, 1975: Harmon Killebrew was released by the Twins.

Regular season
Having released Harmon Killebrew during the off-season, owner Calvin Griffith devised "Harmon Killebrew Day" as a promotion for the slugger's return with his new club, the Kansas City Royals.  On Sunday, May 4, DH Killebrew greeted the crowd of just 14,805 with a first-inning home run.  In the fifth inning, Minnesota pitcher Jim Hughes hit Harmon with a pitch. 

Only one Twins player made the All-Star Game, second baseman Rod Carew. Only 737,156 fans attended Twins games, the lowest total in the American League.

On August 22, Dave McKay debuted in the majors as the starting third baseman for the Twins.  In his first at bat leading off the third inning, he homered off Detroit's Vern Ruhle.  Only one other Twin had homered in his first at bat – Rick Renick in 1968.  The duo will be joined in history by Gary Gaetti (1981), Andre David (1984) and Eddie Rosario (2015), who homers on the first major-league pitch thrown to him.

Carew won his fifth AL batting title with a .359 average. Three pitchers had double digit wins: Jim Hughes (16–14), Bert Blyleven (15–10), and Dave Goltz (14–14).

Season standings

Record vs. opponents

Notable transactions
 June 14, 1975: Bobby Darwin was traded by the Twins to the Milwaukee Brewers for Johnny Briggs.

Roster

Player stats

Batting

Starters by position
Note: Pos = Position; G = Games played; AB = At bats; H = Hits; Avg. = Batting average; HR = Home runs; RBI = Runs batted in

Other batters
Note: G = Games played; AB = At bats; H = Hits; Avg. = Batting average; HR = Home runs; RBI = Runs batted in

Pitching

Starting pitchers
Note: G = Games pitched; IP = Innings pitched; W = Wins; L = Losses; ERA = Earned run average; SO = Strikeouts

Other pitchers
Note: G = Games pitched; IP = Innings pitched; W = Wins; L = Losses; ERA = Earned run average; SO = Strikeouts

Relief pitchers
Note: G = Games pitched; W = Wins; L = Losses; SV = Saves; ERA = Earned run average; SO = Strikeouts

Farm system

LEAGUE CHAMPIONS: Reno

Reno affiliation shared with San Diego Padres

Notes

References

Player stats from www.baseball-reference.com
Team info from www.baseball-almanac.com

Minnesota Twins seasons
Minnesota Twins season
Minnesota Twins